The Willhire 24 Hour was an endurance race for production cars held at Snetterton Motor Racing Circuit in Norfolk, England between 1980 and 1994. Over the years, the race included both sports cars and saloon cars. Latterly, it was contested by competitors running in the FIA Group N specification National Saloon Car Cup. The race was run by the British Racing and Sports Car Club (BRSCC), which was also responsible for the aforementioned series.

History
The race was sponsored by Willhire Vehicles Rentals (now Anglian Willhire, part of Northgate), a local car rental company, after its owner Roger Williams was approached to sponsor a motor racing event at the circuit. Williams talked about sponsoring a 6- or 24-hour event, initially as a joke, but the offer was accepted and the United Kingdom's first 24-hour race was founded. The race was first held in 1980. The 1989 event was 25 hours long to mark the 25th anniversary of the Willhire company. The final event was held in 1994.

Participants and winners
The Willhire 24 Hour was won by a number of drivers who went on to have success in other forms of racing. In 1986, the winning car was co-driven by then BBC Radio 1 disc jockey Mike Smith and Lionel Abbott, who became the first two-driver team to win the race. The full list of winners is given below. Other notable drivers who competed in the past other than those listed below include Martin Brundle, Steve Soper, John Cleland, Kieth O'dor, Tiff Needell, James Thompson and Gerry Marshall. Stirling Moss was part of a class-winning team at the race in 1980, driving a Volkswagen Scirocco.

Legacy

Snetterton's experience in hosting a 24-hour race was proven to be beneficial when subsequently, the track became a host of some British Touring Car Championship night races from 1999, and Willhire-sponsored endurance races in 2002, 2003 and 2004, but full 24-hour racing did not return until 2003, when the 2CV 24 Hour Race moved to Snetterton. However, national 24 hour endurance racing would not return until the introduction of the Silverstone Britcar 24-Hour in 2005, taking place at Silverstone Circuit. The 2005 Britcar event is sometimes referred to as the Britcar Willhire 24 Hour Race.

References

Sports car races
Touring car races
Auto races in the United Kingdom
Sport in Norfolk